Opsimini is a tribe of beetles in the subfamily Cerambycinae, containing the following genera and species:

 Genus Dicentrus
 Dicentrus bidentatus (Champlain & Knull, 1926)
 Dicentrus bluthneri LeConte, 1880
 Dicentrus mehli Vitali & Damgaard, 2016
 Genus Europsimus
 Europsimus germanicus Vitali, 2011
 Genus Japonopsimus
 Japonopsimus balticus Vitali, 2014
 Japonopsimus exocentroides Holzschuh, 1984
 Japonopsimus orientalis (Matsushita, 1933)
 Japonopsimus simplex (Gressitt & Rondon, 1970)
 Genus Opsimus
 Opsimus quadrilineatus Mannerheim, 1843

References

Cerambycinae